WZEB (101.7 FM) is a radio station broadcasting a Rhythmic Top 40 format. Licensed to Ocean View, Delaware, United States, the station serves the Salisbury-Ocean City market.  The station is currently owned by The Voice Radio Network.

History
101.7 was originally put on the air around May 1985 as WOVU, licensed to Ocean View, Delaware. The station had an adult contemporary format that stayed on the air until 1989. In 1989, Tony Q. Foxx bought WOVU. The call letters were changed to WRKE and the name was changed to 101.7 Kiss-FM, changing to an urban adult contemporary format with a lean toward soft urban adult contemporary (Love Songs). 101.7 Kiss-FM stayed on the air until 1998 when Tony sold the station to Great Scott Broadcasting.

Great Scott Broadcasting, who had also bought WSUX 98.5, put on a Classic Hits format, known as BIG-Classic Hits 98.5 & 101.7. The call letters were changed to WRBG to match the name of the station. In April 2001, 101.7 WRBG was broken off and flipped to Today's Hit Music B101-7 and the call letters were changed to WZEB. The station was targeted the females 18-49 demographic. Two years later, the station was paired with the WKDB for greater coverage area. On August 25, 2009, GSB cut the simulcast with 95.3 WKDB. In late 2011, WKDB brought back the simulcast of The B.

On November 1, 2014, WZEB split from its simulcast with WKDB and changed their format to urban contemporary, branded as "Power 101.7".

On February 27, 2020, WZEB changed their format to rhythmic contemporary music, while retaining the "Power 101.7" branding.

References

External links

ZEB
Radio stations established in 1986
Rhythmic contemporary radio stations in the United States
1986 establishments in Delaware